The Andrei Bely Prize (Russian: Премия Андрея Белого; Premiya Andreya Belovo) is the oldest independent literary prize awarded in Russia. It was established in 1978 by the staff of Hours, the largest samizdat literary journal in Leningrad, to recognize excellence in three categories: prose, poetry, and theory. The prize was named for Andrei Bely, whose influence spanned Russian poetry, prose, and humanitarianism. 

Materially, the prize consisted of an apple, a single ruble, and a bottle of vodka. Despite its playful character, the prize quickly became a major phenomenon of Russian literary life, and was awarded to a number of significant writers, including novelists Andrei Bitov, Sasha Sokolov, and Yevgeny Kharitonov, poets Gennady Aygi, Olga Sedakova, and Elena Schwarz, philosopher Boris Groys, critic Mikhail Epstein, and Sinologist Vladimir Malyavin. After a lull in the early 1990s, it was revived in 1997 with the addition of a fourth category, "services to literature", and continues to be awarded to this day. Recent laureates have included Mikhail Gasparov, Vladimir Toporov, Margarita Meklina, Mikhail Gronas, Shamshad Abdullaev, Vladimir Sorokin, Victor Pelevin, Boris Dubin, Sergei Kruglov, Aleksandr Lavrov, Elena Fanailova and Aleksandra Gennadievna Petrova.

External links
  Entry at the New Literary Map of Russia

 Russian literary awards
 Awards established in 1978
1978 establishments in the Soviet Union